The 2009 Taça de Portugal Final was the final match of the 2008–09 Taça de Portugal, the 69th season of the Taça de Portugal, the premier Portuguese football cup competition organized by the Portuguese Football Federation (FPF). The match was played on 31 May 2009 at the Estádio Nacional in Oeiras, and opposed two Primeira Liga sides: Paços de Ferreira and Porto. Porto defeated Paços de Ferreira 1–0 thanks to a sixth-minute goal from Argentine forward Lisandro López, which would give Porto their 14th Taça de Portugal.

In Portugal, the final was televised live in HD on TVI and Sport TV. As Porto claimed both league and cup double in the same season, cup runners-up Paços de Ferreira faced their cup final opponents in the 2009 Supertaça Cândido de Oliveira at the Estádio Municipal de Aveiro.

Match

Details

References

2009
2008–09 in Portuguese football
F.C. Paços de Ferreira matches
FC Porto matches